David ben Yirmiyahu Radner (22 February 1848 – 11 November 1901) was a Lithuanian Jewish writer and translator.

He translated into Hebrew Friedrich Schiller's William Tell (1878) and Don Carlos (1879), Salomon Hermann Mosenthal's Deborah (1880), and David Cassel's Lehrbuch der jüdischen Geschichte und Literatur (1886).

References
 

1848 births
1901 deaths
Translators to Hebrew
Writers from Vilnius
Jewish translators
People of the Haskalah
19th-century translators
German–Hebrew translators